Po Binasuor (died 1390), Ngo-ta Ngo-che, Cei Bunga, Chế Bồng Nga (Bunga is the Malay word for 'flower', and "Chế" is the Vietnamese transliteration of Cei, a Cham word that means "uncle" - and was, in the days of Champa, frequently used to refer to generals) ruled Champa from 1360–1390 CE. He was also known as The Red King in Vietnamese stories. He is differed from Po Binnasuar, the king of Panduranga from 1316-1361. 

Po Binasuor was the last strong king of the kingdom of Champa.

Reign

Chế Bồng Nga apparently managed to unite the Cham lands under his rule and by 1361 was strong enough to attack Đại Việt from the sea. In 1372 he sent a letter to Hongwu Emperor of China warned that the Viet were about to attack his country, demanding the Ming for protection and war materiel. His Cham forces sacked the Vietnamese capital city of Thăng Long (modern Hanoi) four times, once in 1371, twice on 1377 and on 1383. They set the city on fire, seizing women, jewels, and silks. All Vietnamese books held in the royal palace were lost. This second attack followed the death of king Trần Duệ Tông after his failed assault on Vijaya. In 1378 he married Prince Trần Húc, a Vietnamese royal captive, to his daughter and put the prince in charge of the Cham army advance into Nghe An. Dai Viet court, due to lacking of a central control over manpower and resources, unable to reassert power in the south, where Po Binasuor recruited Vietnamese men from southern regions for his army.

The Chams then forced the king of Đại Việt, Trần Phế Đế, to move the state's treasures and wealth to Mount Thienkien and the Kha-lang Caves in 1379. Chế Bồng Nga continued to occupy the two southern Vietnamese provinces of Nghệ An and Thanh Hóa, though he was stopped by Hồ Quý Ly in 1380 and 1382. In 1390, Po Binasuor was finally stopped in another invasion of the capital, when his royal barge suffered a musketry salvo.

Family and children
King Chế Bồng Nga had only one Queen named Siti Zubaidah, belonged to the Kelantan clan. They had two princes and one princess. The two princes defected to the Vietnamese after general La Khai took the Cham crown.

Legacy
The events of Chế Bồng Nga's reign spelled the end of the Trần dynasty in Đại Việt, which was revealed as weak and ineffective in the face of the Cham General.

See also
 Champa
 King of Champa

External links
 http://www.usmta.com/history-1.htm
 http://www.viettouch.com/champa/champa_history.html

References

Citation

Bibliography

 
  
 

 
  
  
  
  
 
 

Kings of Champa
Hindu monarchs
Vietnamese Hindus
1390 deaths
Year of birth unknown
14th-century Vietnamese monarchs
Vietnamese monarchs